Nick Poole (born July 11, 1973) is a Canadian former professional ice hockey player. He was most recently the general manager for Milton Keynes Lightning in the English Premier Ice Hockey League. Previously Poole was a player and head coach for Lightning, an ice hockey team based in England.

Poole played college hockey in the United States, at the University of New Hampshire. After college, he turned professional with the Dayton Bombers of the East Coast Hockey League.  Poole moved to Europe where he established himself further. He has since won numerous league and playoff titles with Milton Keynes Lightning. He is the team's longest serving player, having joined the team when it was first established in 2002 and is also the most successful player/coach the team has had. As a player, he wears the number 91 jersey, the year he started his career in ice hockey.

Poole left MK Lightning on the 26th November 2016 and his number 91 jersey was retired.

Poole also worked at Oxley Park Academy as a physical education teacher.

Career statistics

Honours
EPIHL League Champion: 2003/2004, 2004/2005, 2009/2010

EPIHL Playoff Winner: 2002/2003, 2003/2004, 2004/2005, 2005/2006

EPIHL Playoff Runner-Up: 2008/2009, 2010/2011

EPIHL Cup Runner-Up: 2006/2007, 2007/2008

External links

References

1973 births
Canadian ice hockey forwards
Dayton Bombers players
Living people
Manchester Phoenix players
Manchester Storm (1995–2002) players
Milton Keynes Lightning players
Ice hockey people from Calgary
Canadian expatriate ice hockey players in England